, also known as Masao Iwata, was a Japanese professional Go player.

Biography 
Iwata was a 9-dan Go professional from the Nagoya branch of the Nihon Ki-in. He won his 800th professional game in 2004. He retired from tournament play in 2011. He died in 2022 at the age of 96.

Promotion record

Titles & runners-up

See also 

 International Go Federation
 List of Go organizations
 List of professional Go tournaments

References 

1926 births
2022 deaths
Japanese Go players
Sportspeople from Nagoya